Ray Preston may refer to:

Ray Preston (American football) (born 1954), American football player
Ray Preston (rugby league) (1929–2019), Australian rugby league footballer
Ray Preston (Australian footballer) (born 1930), Australian rules footballer